Kjerringøy is a village in Bodø Municipality in Nordland county, Norway. The Kjerringøy Church is located in the village. 

The Kjerringøy trading post, a part of the Nordland Museum, is located in the village. The trading post is well-preserved, with around 15 authentic buildings with interior. It is a popular tourist destination and is often used as a location for movies.

Historically, the village was the administrative centre of the old municipality of Kjerringøy which existed from 1906 until 1964.

References

External links
http://www.kjerringoy.no
http://www.kjerringoy.info

Bodø
Villages in Nordland
Populated places of Arctic Norway